Central Arkansas, also known as the Little Rock metro, designated by the United States Office of Management and Budget as the Little Rock-North Little Rock-Conway Metropolitan Statistical Area, is the most populous metro area in the U.S. state of Arkansas. With an estimated 2020 population of 748,031, it is the most populated area in Arkansas. Located at the convergence of Arkansas's other geographic regions, the region's central location make Central Arkansas an important population, economic, education, and political center in Arkansas and the South. Little Rock is the state's capital and largest city, and the city is also home to two Fortune 500 companies, Arkansas Children's Hospital, and University of Arkansas for Medical Sciences (UAMS).

History
The site known as "little rock" along the Arkansas River was found by explorer Bernard de la Harpe in 1722. The territorial capitol had been located at Arkansas Post in Southeast Arkansas since 1819, but the site had proven unsuitable as a settlement due to frequent flooding of the Arkansas River. Over the years, the "little rock" was known as a waypoint along the river, but remained unsettled. A land speculator from St. Louis, Missouri who had acquired many acres around the "little rock" began pressuring the Arkansas territorial legislature in February 1820 to move the capital to the site, but the representatives could not decide between Little Rock or Cadron (now Conway), which was the preferred site of Territorial Governor James Miller. The issue was tabled until October 1820, by which time most of the legislators and other influential men had purchased lots around Little Rock. The legislature moved the capital to Little Rock, where it has remained ever since.

Geography

Central Arkansas is located in the Southern United States (commonly known as the South in the US), and within a subregion commonly known as the Deep South, although it is influenced by Upper South culture. The South is a distinct cultural region reliant upon a plantation economy in the 18th and 19th century, until the secession of the Confederate States of America and the Civil War.

The region is the point of convergence for five other Arkansas regions: the Ozarks to the north, the Arkansas River Valley & the Ouachita Mountains to the west, the Arkansas Delta to the east, and Piney Woods to the southwest.

The Arkansas River crosses the region, and serves as the dividing line between Little Rock and North Little Rock. The Arkansas is an important geographic feature in Central Arkansas, requiring long bridge spans but allowing barge traffic to the Port of Little Rock and points upriver.

Demographics

Central Arkansas includes both the Little Rock-North Little Rock-Conway MSA, though the broader Little Rock CSA is also considered Central Arkansas. The MSA is defined by the United States Office of Management and Budget as Faulkner, Grant, Lonoke, Perry, Pulaski and Saline counties. The CSA definition adds the Pine Bluff metropolitan area adding Cleveland, Jefferson, and Lincoln counties, and the Searcy Micropolitan Area, which adds White County.

It is the core of the broader Little Rock-North Little Rock Combined Statistical Area (CSA). Its economic, cultural, and demographic center is Little Rock, Arkansas's capital and largest city. The Little Rock Combined Statistical area spans ten counties and had an estimated population of 905,847 in 2016.

Prior to 2002, the area consisted of four core counties: Pulaski, Faulkner, Saline and Lonoke. The area was later expanded to include adjoining Perry County to the west, and Grant County to the south. The city of Conway was designated as a third principal city for the MSA by 2007.

2000 Census

MSA
As of the census of 2000, there were 610,518 people, 241,094 households, and 165,405 families residing within the MSA. The racial makeup of the MSA was 75.40% White, 21.02% African American, 0.44% Native American, 0.96% Asian, 0.04% Pacific Islander, 0.87% from other races, and 1.27% from two or more races. Hispanic or Latino of any race were 2.07% of the population.

The median income for a household in the MSA was $37,912, and the median income for a family was $44,572. Males had a median income of $31,670 versus $23,354 for females. The per capita income for the MSA was $18,305.

CSA
As of the census of 2000, there were 785,024 people, 304,335 households, and 210,966 families residing within the CSA. The racial makeup of the CSA was 73.97% White, 22.73% African American, 0.42% Native American, 0.85% Asian, 0.04% Pacific Islander, 0.80% from other races, and 1.20% from two or more races. Hispanic or Latino of any race were 1.93% of the population.

The median income for a household in the CSA was $35,301, and the median income for a family was $41,804. Males had a median income of $31,192 versus $22,347 for females. The per capita income for the CSA was $16,898.

Communities
Communities are categorized based on their populations in the 2000 U.S. Census.

Places with more than 100,000 inhabitants
Little Rock (principal city)

Places with 50,000 to 100,000 inhabitants
Conway (principal city)
North Little Rock (principal city)

Places with 10,000 to 50,000 inhabitants
Benton
Bryant
Cabot
Jacksonville
Maumelle
Pine Bluff
Searcy
Sherwood

Places with 1,000 to 10,000 inhabitants

Places with 500 to 1,000 inhabitants

Places with fewer than 500 inhabitants

Population trends

Economy

The Little Rock Regional Chamber of Commerce, the oldest association in Arkansas, has produced the following list of largest employers in Central Arkansas. 

Source: Little Rock Regional Chamber of Commerce

Higher education

Notable colleges and universities

Infrastructure

Transportation

Major highways

 Interstate 30
 Interstate 430
 Interstate 530
 Interstate 630
 Interstate 40
 Interstate 440
 U.S. Highway 64
 U.S. Highway 65
 U.S. Highway 67
 U.S. Highway 70
 U.S. Highway 165
 U.S. Highway 167
 U.S. Highway 270

Aviation

The Clinton National Airport in Little Rock is the largest commercial airport in the state, with more than 100 flights arriving or departing each day and nonstop jet service to eighteen cities. North Little Rock Municipal Airport, located across the Arkansas River, is designated as a general aviation reliever airport for Clinton National by the Federal Aviation Administration (FAA). Central Arkansas also has several smaller municipally owned general aviation airports: Conway Airport at Cantrell Field in Conway, Saline County Regional in Benton, Grider Field in Pine Bluff.

Professional sports

The city of Little Rock is home to the Arkansas Travelers. The Travelers are the AA Minor League Baseball affiliate of the Seattle Mariners. They compete in the Texas League and play their home games at Dickey–Stephens Park.

See also

Arkansas metropolitan areas
Enola earthquake swarm

References

 

 
Regions of Arkansas